Neco may refer to 
Neco (Manoel Nunes 1895–1977), Brazilian association football midfielder
Neco (footballer, born 1964) (Manoel Carlos de Lima Filho), Brazilian football winger and manager
Neco Brett (born 1992), Jamaican football forward
Neco Celik (born 1972), Turkish-German filmmaker
Neco Martínez (born 1982), Colombian football goalkeeper
Neço Muko (1899–1934), Albanian singer and composer
Neco Williams (born 2001), Welsh football player
Danilo Neco (born 1986), Brazilian football player

See also
Necho (disambiguation)